Rho Indi b is a planet that orbits around Rho Indi. Its semimajor axis is 2.54 AU placing just outside the star's habitable zone. The planet takes 3.7 years to orbit the star. It is over twice as massive as Jupiter.

See also
Tau1 Gruis b

References 
 web preprint

External links
The Extrasolar Planets Encyclopedia: HD 216437 planet entry

Indus (constellation)
Giant planets
Exoplanets discovered in 2002
Exoplanets detected by radial velocity